Nicole Isau Hayes (born April 5, 1984) is a retired Palauan swimmer and national record holder, who specialized in sprint freestyle events. Hayes became the first Palauan Olympic swimmer in history when she swam at the 2000 Summer Olympics.

The inaugural year of Palau's participation in the Olympic Games, Hayes qualified for the 2000 Olympics via an Olympic Solidarity and a Universality place. She competed in the women's 100 m freestyle. Swimming in heat one, Hayes swam a new Palauan record of 1:00.89 to command a top position, placing forty-seventh overall on the morning prelims.

In addition to the Sydney Olympic Games, Hayes competed for the Republic of Palau at the following events:

- 1999 - Micronesian Games (Koror, Palau)

- 2000 - Oceania Swimming Championships (Christchurch, New Zealand)

- 2001 - 9th FINA World Swimming Championships (Fukuoka, Japan)

- 2002 - Micronesian Games (Phonpei, FSM)

- 2003 - XII South Pacific Games (Suva, Fiji)

- 2003 - 10th FINA World Aquatics Championships (Barcelona, Spain)

References

External links
 

1984 births
Living people
Palauan female swimmers
Olympic swimmers of Palau
Swimmers at the 2000 Summer Olympics
Palauan female freestyle swimmers
People from Koror